Barone Canavese is a comune (municipality) in the Metropolitan City of Turin in the Italian region Piedmont, located about  northeast of Turin.

Barone Canavese borders the following municipalities: Mercenasco, San Giorgio Canavese, Candia Canavese, Orio Canavese, and Caluso.

References

Cities and towns in Piedmont